Cerisy-la-Salle is a commune in the Manche department in Normandy in north-western France.

Heraldry

See also
 Centre culturel international de Cerisy-la-Salle
 Communes of the Manche department

References

Cerisylasalle